Something in the Night is the ninth studio album by American country rock band Pure Prairie League, released in 1981. The band did not release another album until 2005's All in Good Time.

Track listing
All tracks composed by Vince Gill; except where indicated
"Don't Keep Me Hangin'" - 3:45
"Love Me Again" - 2:50
"Hold on to Our Hearts" - 3:43
"Something in the Night" (Dan Greer, Jeff Wilson, Steve Woodard) - 2:41
"Do You Love Me Truly, Julie?" - 3:45
"You're Mine Tonight" (Rafe Van Hoy) - 3:31
"Still Right Here in My Heart" (Dan Greer, Jeff Wilson) - 2:56
"I Wanna Know Your Name" - 3:08
"Feel the Fire" (Dan Greer, Jeff Wilson, Woodard) - 3:33
"Tell Me One More Time" (Dan Greer, Jeff Wilson) - 4:04

Personnel
Pure Prairie League
Vince Gill - banjo, guitar, violin, vocals
Jeff Wilson - guitar, vocals
Michael Reilly - bass, vocals
Michael Connor - keyboards
Billy Hinds - drums
Additional personnel
Kristine Arnold - vocals
Ricky Fataar - percussion
Renée Geyer - vocals
Nicky Hopkins - piano
Gary Mielke - synthesizer
Janis Oliver-Gill - vocals
Mickey Raphael - harmonica
David Sanborn - saxophone
Johnny Lee Schell - guitar
Dick Sims - organ
Fredrioco Spumani - percussion

Production
Producer: Rob Fraboni
Engineer: Terry Becker, Tim Kramer
Assistant engineer: Steve Gillmor
Art direction: Tim Bryant
Design: Jeff Wack
Photography: Scott Hensel

Charts
Album - Billboard (United States)

Singles - Billboard (United States)

References

Pure Prairie League albums
1981 albums
Albums produced by Rob Fraboni
Casablanca Records albums